The Mysteries of Love is a 2010 TVB modern series.

Summary
This is a love story between a professor and a policewoman. Their dating experience is enhanced with sense and sensibility through the application of interesting physics theories on the investigation of various crime cases.

Kingsley King (Raymond Lam) is regarded as the youngest genius in physics and he is appointed as an associate professor in a Hong Kong university. Invited by his good friend Lo Tin-Hang (Kenneth Ma), Senior Inspector of Police at Regional Crime Unit, Kingsley assists in cracking many mysterious crime cases through his expertise in physics.

During his police work, Kingsley meets policewoman Tsui Siu-Lai (Tavia Yeung) who acts as a liaison with the Regional Crime Unit and Kingsley. The rational Kingsley evaluates that he has fallen in love with Lai because of a neurotransmitter called phenethylamine. However, owing to the huge difference in their family backgrounds and life values, Kingsley fails to tackle their ever-changing relationship problems with formulas. In the end, due to various life changing experiences, Kingsley realizes that love cannot be rationalized and finally admits that his feelings to Siu-Lai are true.

On the other hand, the romantic and uninhibited Lo Tin-Hang has been maintaining a sex only relationship with the journalist Ling Man-Ka (Bernice Liu). Lo Tin-Hang doesn't believe in eternity and he is only looking for sensual pleasure in a woman. However, his belief is suddenly shattered when he learns that Ling Man-Ka is going to get married.

Cast

The King family

The Tsui Family

Other Cast

Awards and nominations
TVB Anniversary Awards (2010)
 Nominated: Best Drama - Top 5
 Nominated: Best Actor (Raymond Lam) - Top 5
 Nominated: Best Actress (Tavia Yeung) - Top 5
 Nominated: Best Supporting Actor (Kenneth Ma)
 Won: My Favourite Male Character (Raymond Lam)
 Nominated: My Favourite Female Character (Tavia Yeung) - Top 5
 Nominated: Most Improved Actor (Jazz Lam)
My AOD Favourites 2010 - My Favourite Drama Character
Raymond Lam  for King Pok/Kingsley -  Winner
"Tavia Yeung" for Chui Siu Lai -  Winner

Viewership ratings

References

TVB dramas
Hong Kong drama television series
2010 Hong Kong television series debuts
2010 Hong Kong television series endings
Television shows involved in plagiarism controversies